The SS Bull Run was a type T2 tanker built at Sun Shipbuilding and Drydock Co. in Chester, PA as hull number 287 and USMC number 362 in 1943.  In 1956, the ship was acquired by the US Navy from the Maritime Administration, assigned to MSTS, and placed in-service as the USNS Bull Run (T-AO-156).  She left the navy in 1957, going back to the Maritime Administration.  In 1969, the stern of the Bull Run was attached to the bow of the Type C4 ship the Anchorage, and the completed ship then retained the name Anchorage.  The bow of the Bull Run was then scrapped.

References
 T2Tanker.org
  NavSource Online: Service Ship Photo Archive  USNS Bull Run (T-AO-156)

 

Type T2-SE-A1 tankers
1943 ships
Ships built by the Sun Shipbuilding & Drydock Company
World War II tankers of the United States
Type T2-SE-A1 tankers of the United States Navy